DFMA stands for Design for Manufacture and Assembly.  DFMA is the combination of two methodologies; Design for Manufacture, which means the design for ease of manufacture of the parts that will form a product, and Design for Assembly, which means the design of the product for ease of assembly deriving creative ideas at the same time. Critics of DFM from within industry argue that DFM/DFA is simply a new and unnecessary term for something that has existed as long as manufacturing itself, and is otherwise known as engineering design.

Usage
DFMA is used as the basis for concurrent engineering studies to provide guidance to the design team in simplifying the product structure, to reduce manufacturing and assembly costs, and to quantify improvements. The practice of applying DFMA is to identify, quantify and eliminate waste or inefficiency in a product design. DFMA is therefore a component of Lean Manufacturing
DFMA is also used as a benchmarking tool to study competitors’ products, and as a should cost tool to assist in supplier negotiations.

Software
DFMA is the name of the integrated set of software products from Boothroyd Dewhurst, Inc. that are used by companies to implement the DFMA methodology.  DFMA is a registered trademark of Boothroyd Dewhurst, Inc.

Notes

References
 “DFMA Takes a Back-to-Basics Product Simplification Strategy to Cut Costs” September 2010 article from Design News magazine
 “DFMA Hits the Jackpot” July 2010 article from Desktop Engineering magazine
 Official European DFMA Site
 DFMA Official Site

Product development
Design